Promised Land or Promise Land was a former railroad station stop on the Montauk Branch of the Long Island Rail Road. It opened as a flag stop only, for employees of neighboring fish processing plants. The station appears as a signal stop as '"Promise Land" in special instructions of employee timetable #15 of June 29, 1900, as well as employee timetable #27 of June 25, 1908 and employee timetable #49 of September 9, 1908. It also appears under station designation S106 in 1903, 1913, and 1924 CR4BOOKS according to Art Huneke. The station closed on December 31, 1928 according to Robert Emery.

References

External links

Former Long Island Rail Road stations in Suffolk County, New York
Railway stations closed in 1928
1928 disestablishments in New York (state)
1900 establishments in New York (state)
Railway stations in the United States opened in 1900